Raymond George Reed Baxter (9 March 1904 – 29 August 1988) was an Australian rules footballer who played with Richmond in the Victorian Football League (VFL).

Notes

External links 

1904 births
1988 deaths
Australian rules footballers from Melbourne
Richmond Football Club players
People from Frankston, Victoria